

Seeds

Qualifiers

Lucky losers
  Elena Dementieva

Qualifying draw

First qualifier

Second qualifier

Third qualifier

Fourth qualifier

Fifth qualifier

Sixth qualifier

Seventh qualifier

Eighth qualifier

References
1999 French Open – Women's draws and results at the International Tennis Federation

Women's Singles Qualifying
French Open by year – Qualifying